George M. McKelvey is an American politician. A Democrat, he served two terms as Mayor of Youngstown, Ohio, from 1998 to 2005. Prior to serving as mayor, he served two terms as the Treasurer of Mahoning County. He has also been a teacher, school administrator and city council member in Youngstown.

In 2004, he broke ranks with his Democratic party to endorse Republican President George W. Bush for a second term.

In March 2008, McKelvey was named a U.S. Observer with the International Fund for Ireland.

Notes

External links
Interview with McKelvey, 29 November 2008

Mayors of Youngstown, Ohio
Living people
Ohio Democrats
Year of birth missing (living people)